Partito Socialista Unitario may refer to:
 Unitary Socialist Party (Italy, 1922) (1922–1930), a political party in Italy
 Unitary Socialist Party (Italy, 1949) (1949–1951), a political party in Italy
 The denomination assumed by the Italian Democratic Socialist Party from 1969 to 1971